The President's Committee on Civil Rights was a United States presidential commission established by President Harry Truman in 1946. The committee was created by Executive Order 9808 on December 5, 1946, and instructed to investigate the status of civil rights in the country and propose measures to strengthen and protect them. After the committee submitted a report of its findings to President Truman, it disbanded in December 1947.

History
The committee was charged with examining the condition of civil rights in the United States, producing a written report of their findings, and submitting recommendations on improving civil rights in the United States. In December 1947, the committee produced a 178-page report entitled To Secure These Rights: The Report of the President’s Committee on Civil Rights. In the report, it proposed to establish a permanent Civil Rights Commission, Joint Congressional Committee on Civil Rights, and a Civil Rights Division in the Department of Justice; to develop federal protection from lynching; a permanent fair employment practice commission; to abolish poll taxes; and urged other measures. Furthermore, the report raised the distinct possibility that the UN Charter from 1945 could also be used as a source of law to fight persistent racial discrimination in the US. 
  
On July 26, 1948, President Truman advanced the recommendations of the report by signing Executive Order 9980 and Executive Order 9981. Executive Order 9980 ordered the desegregation of the federal work force and Executive Order 9981 ordered the desegregation of the armed services. He also sent a special message to Congress on February 2, 1948, to implement the recommendations of the President's Committee on Civil Rights.

The President's Committee on Civil Rights report also paved way for African-American diplomats to break into previously white-dominated positions. Under President Truman, Edward R. Dudley would become the first African American given an ambassadorship, in part due to the findings of race-relations from the committee. However, these moves were largely done due to a harming of foreign relations due to the United States' race problem. Even with the committee's findings, President Truman had trouble acting on his own research, due to domestic backlash.

Membership
The committee was composed of 15 members:

Charles Edward Wilson (Chairman)
Sadie T. Alexander
James B. Carey
John Sloan Dickey
Morris Ernst
Roland B. Gittelsohn
Frank Porter Graham
Francis J. Haas
Charles Luckman
Francis P. Matthews
Franklin Delano Roosevelt Jr.
Henry Knox Sherrill
Boris Shishkin
Dorothy Rogers Tilly
Channing Heggie Tobias

Publication
President's Committee on Civil Rights. To Secure These Rights: The Report of the President's Committee on Civil Rights. Washington: GPO, 1947.

See also
 Executive Order 8802, signed by President Franklin D. Roosevelt on July 25, 1941, to prohibit ethnic or racial discrimination in the nation's defense industry
 National Emergency Committee Against Mob Violence

References

Notes
"Executive Order 9980, Regulations Governing Fair Employment Practices Within the Federal Establishment," and "Executive Order 9981, Establishing the President's Committee on Equality of Treatment and Opportunity in the Armed Services, Harry S Truman" from Federal Register, retrieved January 23, 2006. For more details on the desegregation of the armed forces see, "Truman Library: Desegregation of the Armed Forces Online Research File" from the Truman Presidential Museum & Library, retrieved May 4, 2010.

Further reading

External links
To Secure These Rights: The Report of the President’s Committee on Civil Rights Full text of document available from the Truman Presidential Museum & Library
 Christopher N.J. Roberts: William H. Fitzpatrick’s Editorials on Human Rights (1949), published by Arbeitskreis Menschenrechte im 20. Jahrhundert, published at "Quellen zur Geschichte der Menschenrechte"

African-American history between emancipation and the civil rights movement
African-American history of the United States military
Civil rights movement
Establishments by United States executive order
History of civil rights in the United States
Presidency of Harry S. Truman
Civil Rights, President's Committee on